Dilip Barua (2 August 1946 – 28 October 2015) was a Bangladeshi football player who played as a center-back. He was a member of the first Bangladesh national football team, in 1973.

Playing career
Dilip Barua was born on 2 August 1946, in Purva Gujra village of Cox's Bazar. In 1964, he started his football career in Chittagong's First Division League with at Young Star Club. From then till 1979, he played regularly as an essential player for established teams in Dhaka and Chittagong. He was a member of the Chittagong District team from 1967-1978, and captained them 5 times. In 1970, he played for East Pakistan Combined University in divisional level. 

He played for Bangladesh WAPDA in both the Chittagong League and Dhaka League. He played for the Chittagong based side for alsmot 14 years starting from 1968, while being an employee of WAPDA. In 1973, he was among one of the four players selected from WAPDA by coach Sheikh Shaheb Ali, for the first Bangladesh national football team, which went on to partake in Malaysia's Merdeka Cup that year. In 1975, he represented Abahani Krira Chakra at the Aga Khan Gold Cup. Dilip was the captain of the Chittagong District team when they finished runners-up at the National Football Championship in 1977.

Coaching career
Dilip retired from playing in 1979, and turned to coaching. He served as the coach of the Chittagong District team, while also coaching Chittagong Mohammedan SC, W.A.P.D.A and City Corporation teams in the Chittagong Football league. In 2011, under his guidance, City Corporation became league champions.

Death
On 28 October 2015, Dilip died after suffering from lung cancer.

Honours

Player
Chittagong WAPDA
Chittagong League = 1972

Manager
City Corporation FT
Chittagong League = 2011

References

1946 births
2015 deaths
Deaths from lung cancer in Bangladesh
Bangladeshi footballers
Bangladesh international footballers
Bangladeshi Hindus
People from Cox's Bazar District
Association football defenders
Abahani Limited (Dhaka) players
Bangladeshi football managers